No Retreat... No Surrender... Si Kumander is a 1987 Filipino action comedy film directed by Pablo Santiago and starring Fernando Poe Jr. and his wife Susan Roces, the latter as the titular commander. It is a sequel to the 1982 film Manedyer... Si Kumander. Produced by FPJ Productions, the film was released on September 17, 1987. Critic Luciano E. Soriano of the Manila Standard gave Kumander a mildly positive review, commending Poe and Roces' "delightful" performances while deeming the film "mildly amusing" and "an over-extended [TV] sitcom".

Cast
Fernando Poe Jr. as Gener, a car dealer
Susan Roces as Benita, a barangay chairperson and real estate agent
Sheryl Cruz
Randy Santiago as Einstein, a scientist
Paquito Diaz
Bong Dimayacyac
Chichay as Lola Baby
Dencio Padilla as Dennis
Bayani Casimiro as Lolo Boy
Tina Loy
Mely Tagasa as Honorata, Benita's friend
Tatlong Pinoy
Bamba
Max Alvarado
Janice Jurado
Joseph Sonora
Jeffrey Sonora
Lollibie
Becky Misa
Vic Varrion
Luis Benedicto
Nonoy de Guzman
Belo Borja
Eddie Tuazon
Jimmy Reyes
Dennis Padilla

Release
The film was given a "G" rating by the Movie and Television Review and Classification Board (MTRCB), and was released on September 17, 1987.

Critical response
Luciano E. Soriano, writing for the Manila Standard, gave Kumander a mildy positive review, stating that the film was a "mildly amusing situation comedy" with varying degrees of success in terms of comedic performances from the actors, though he considers Fernando Poe Jr. and Susan Roces "delightful" in their roles. Soriano also deems it to at least be superior to other local comedies for relying on its situations instead of facial expressions and toilet humor.

References

External links

1987 films
1980s action comedy films
1987 action films
1987 comedy films
Filipino-language films
Films about cults
Films with screenplays by Pablo S. Gomez
Philippine action comedy films
Films directed by Pablo Santiago